Yereminskaya is a rural locality (a village) in Nizhneslobodskoye Rural Settlement, Vozhegodsky District, Vologda Oblast, Russia. The population was 34 as of 2002.

Geography 
Yereminskaya is located 56 km east of Vozhega (the district's administrative centre) by road. Isakovskaya is the nearest rural locality.

References 

Rural localities in Vozhegodsky District